Manuela Hervás Rodríguez (born 1 August 1962) is a Spanish gymnast. She competed in six events at the 1988 Summer Olympics.

References

1962 births
Living people
Spanish female artistic gymnasts
Olympic gymnasts of Spain
Gymnasts at the 1988 Summer Olympics
Gymnasts from Madrid
20th-century Spanish women